Poninka is an urban-type settlement in Shepetivka Raion (district) of Khmelnytskyi Oblast in western Ukraine. It hosts the administration of Poninka settlement hromada, one of the hromadas of Ukraine. The settlement's population was 7,937 as of the 2001 Ukrainian Census and 

The settlement was founded in 1740 and it received the status of an urban-type settlement in 1938.

Until 18 July 2020, Poninka belonged to Polonne Raion. The raion was abolished in July 2020 as part of the administrative reform of Ukraine, which reduced the number of raions of Khmelnytskyi Oblast to three. The area of Polonne Raion was merged into Shepetivka Raion.

References

External links
 The murder of the Jews of Poninka during World War II, at Yad Vashem website.

Urban-type settlements in Shepetivka Raion
Populated places established in 1740
Volhynian Governorate
Shtetls
Holocaust locations in Ukraine